Benjamin Craig (6 December 1915 – 1982) was a professional footballer, who played for Huddersfield Town & Newcastle United. He was born in the village of Leadgate, near Consett, County Durham.

References

1915 births
1982 deaths
People from Leadgate, County Durham
Footballers from County Durham
English footballers
Association football defenders
English Football League players
Huddersfield Town A.F.C. players
Newcastle United F.C. players
FA Cup Final players